Jan Mark (22 June 1943 – 16 January 2006) was a British writer best known for children's books. In all she wrote over fifty novels and plays and many anthologised short stories. She won the annual Carnegie Medal from the Library Association, recognising the year's best children's book by a British subject, both for Thunder and Lightnings (1976) and for Handles (1983). She was also a "Highly Commended" runner up for Nothing To Be Afraid Of (1980). In addition, she has won the Carnegie Medal twice.

Life
Janet Marjorie Brisland was born in Welwyn Garden City, Hertfordshire and was raised and educated in Ashford in Kent. She was a secondary school teacher between 1965 and 1971 and became a full-time writer in 1974.  She was married once and divorced, and was survived by her daughter Isobel and son Alex.

Mark is known for acutely observed short stories that are concise and show an imaginative use of language. She also wrote novels about seemingly ordinary children in contemporary settings, such as Thunder and Lightnings, as well as science fiction novels set in their own universes with their own rules, such as The Ennead. Her last works include the young adult novels The Eclipse of the Century and Useful Idiots.

The title of Thunder and Lightnings, a story set in rural Norfolk, is a reference to the British RAF jet fighter the English Electric Lightning and in turn inspired the name of a website documenting Cold War British military aircraft.

Jan Mark was popular in Flanders, Belgium, where she participated in an educational project to stimulate teachers of English into using teenage fiction in the classroom. Her Flemish friends devoted a website to her and to her work.  

Jan Mark died suddenly at her home in Oxford from meningitis-related septicaemia in January 2006, aged 62.

Selected works
King John and the Abbot (2006) 
Voyager (2006) the sequel to Riding Tycho 
Turbulence (2005) 
Riding Tycho (2005) 
Useful Idiots (2004) 
The Eclipse of the Century (1999) 
Mr Dickens Hits Town (1999) 
The Midas Touch (1999) 
My Frog and I (1997) 
The Tale of Tobias (1996) 
They Do Things Differently There (1994) 
Fun With Mrs Thumb (1993) 
Enough Is Too Much Already (1988) 
Zeno Was Here (1988) 
Fun (1988) 
Trouble Half-way (1986) 
Fur (1986) 
Handles (1985) 
Feet and Other Stories (1983) 
Aquarius (1982) 
The Dead Letter Box (1982) 
Nothing To Be Afraid Of (1981) 
Hairs in the Palm of the Hand (1981) 
Divide and Rule (1980) 
The Ennead (1978) 
Under the Autumn Garden (1977) 
Thunder and Lightnings (1976)

Notes

References

  Obituary in The Guardian
  Obituary in The Times
  Obituary by Nicholas Tucker in The Independent

External links

 Jan Mark at Walker Books
 Jan Mark at Fantastic Fiction
 Jan Mark's Flemish fansite 
 Jan Mark resources and information
 

1943 births
2006 deaths
20th-century British dramatists and playwrights
20th-century British educators
20th-century British novelists
20th-century British short story writers
20th-century British women writers
20th-century British writers
20th-century English dramatists and playwrights
20th-century English educators
20th-century English novelists
20th-century English women writers
21st-century British dramatists and playwrights
21st-century British educators
21st-century British novelists
21st-century British short story writers
21st-century British women writers
21st-century British writers
21st-century English dramatists and playwrights
21st-century English educators
21st-century English novelists
21st-century English women writers
21st-century English writers
British fantasy writers
British horror writers
British schoolteachers
British science fiction writers
British speculative fiction writers
British women children's writers
British women dramatists and playwrights
British women educators
British women novelists
British women short story writers
British women writers
British writers of young adult literature
Carnegie Medal in Literature winners
Deaths from meningitis
Deaths from sepsis
English fantasy writers
English horror writers
English schoolteachers
English science fiction writers
English short story writers
English speculative fiction writers
English women dramatists and playwrights
English women educators
English women novelists
Ghost story writers
Infectious disease deaths in England
Literacy and society theorists
Neurological disease deaths in England
People from Ashford, Kent
People from Welwyn Garden City
British psychological fiction writers
Weird fiction writers
Women science fiction and fantasy writers
Women writers of young adult literature
Writers of young adult science fiction